Niphoparmena meruana is a species of beetle in the family Cerambycidae. It was described by Per Olof Christopher Aurivillius in 1908.

Subspecies
 Niphoparmena meruana meruana Aurivillius, 1908
 Niphoparmena meruana ngorongorensis Breuning, 1960
 Niphoparmena meruana sublaevicollis Breuning, 1960

References

meruana
Beetles described in 1908